Schoenolirion, rush-lily or sunnybell, is a genus of three recognized species of flowering plants, all endemic to the southeastern United States. In the APG III classification system, the genus is placed in the family Asparagaceae, subfamily Agavoideae (formerly the family Agavaceae).

Species

References

Asparagaceae genera
Agavoideae
Endemic flora of the United States